James Davis Stuckey (born June 21, 1958) is a former American college and professional football player who was a defensive tackle in the National Football League (NFL) for seven seasons during the 1980s.  Stuckey played college football for Clemson University, and was recognized as an All-American.  A first-round pick in the 1980 NFL Draft, he played professionally for the San Francisco 49ers and New York Jets of the NFL.

Stuckey was born in Cayce, South Carolina. He attended Airport High School in West Columbia, South Carolina. While there from 1972 to 1976 he played middle linebacker and tight end.

Stuckey attended Clemson University, and played for the Clemson Tigers football team from 1976 to 1979.  As a senior in 1979, he earned consensus first-team All-American honors.

He was drafted in the first round of the 1980 NFL Draft by the 49ers. He was a member of the San Francisco 49ers Super Bowl XVI and Super Bowl XIX winning teams.  One of his more notable accomplishments was sealing a victory over the Dallas Cowboys in the 1981 NFC title game by recovering a fumble from quarterback Danny White with 40 seconds left in the game. This play came shortly after The Catch, a touchdown reception by Stuckey's college teammate Dwight Clark.

References

1958 births
Living people
All-American college football players
American football defensive tackles
Clemson Tigers football players
New York Jets players
People from Cayce, South Carolina
Players of American football from Columbia, South Carolina
San Francisco 49ers players